Atroxima is a plant genus in the milkwort family (Polygalaceae). It is endemic to Western Tropical Africa. It was first described in 1905 by Otto Stapf in the Journal of the Linnean Society. It was initially in the Polygalaeae tribe before being split off with Carpolobia in 1992 to form the Carpolobieae tribe.

Species
As of July 2020, there are 2 accepted species:
Atroxima afzeliana
Atroxima liberica

References

Polygalaceae
Fabales genera